World Shut Your Mouth is the debut solo album by Julian Cope.

Background 
World Shut Your Mouth was written during Cope's 1983 retreat to the village of Drayton Bassett (close to his childhood home of Tamworth), following the breakup of Cope's former band The Teardrop Explodes. Two of the tracks, "Metranil Vavin" and "Pussyface", had in fact been originally intended for The Teardrop Explodes (and different versions of each appear on the belated 1990 release of the band's scrapped third album, Everybody Wants to Shag... The Teardrop Explodes).

Although World Shut Your Mouth generally retained the uptempo pop drive of The Teardrop Explodes, it was also an introspective and surreal work. Cope had spent a period in seclusion in which he recovered from the strain of the final year of the Teardrops and from his LSD excesses of the times. During this period, he had also amassed a huge collection of vintage toys. His eccentric behaviour both during and post-Teardrops had led to him being labelled by the music media as an "acid casualty" in the vein of Syd Barrett and Roky Erikson, an image which would take him several years to shake off. Cope's contemporary vulnerability and childhood preoccupations informed the songs on the album, most notably on songs like "Head Hang Low" and "Sunshine Playroom". Most of the album's tracks featured former Teardrops drummer Gary Dwyer, and other contributors included lead guitarist/producer Steve Lovell (ex-Blitz Brothers), late-period Teardrops bass guitarist Ronnie François and the Dream Academy oboist Kate St. John. It was recorded at The Point Studio in Victoria, London, and engineered by Alex Burak.

World Shut Your Mouth was released on Mercury Records in March 1984, but was seen by critics as somewhat pastoral and out-of-step with the times. It gained poor reviews and sold indifferently. The album's first single "Sunshine Playroom" featured a macabre and disturbing video directed by David Bailey. Both this and the up-tempo follow-up single, "Greatness and Perfection of Love" also flopped.

The album's title was later reused by Cope for another song, which became a hit single in 1986 (and was also taken for the title of a Dom Joly TV show).

Track listing

2015 expanded edition
The first disc of the expanded edition contains the eleven tracks from the original album.

Chart positions

Personnel 
Julian Cope - vocals, rhythm guitar, bass guitar, organ, piano, drum machine
Steve Lovell - lead guitar, sitar, producer
Kate St. John - oboe
Gary Dwyer - drums 
Ronnie François - bass on "Sunshine Playroom" and "Pussyface"
Stephen Creese - drums on "Sunshine Playroom", "Pussyface" and "Greatness and Perfection" 
Andrew Edge - drums on "Lunatic and Fire-Pistol"
Technical
Alex Burak - engineer
Phil Thornalley - engineer
Stephen Power - engineer
Anton Corbijn - photography
Julian Cope and Julian Balme - design
Richard Smith - liner notes (1996 re-issue)

References 

1984 debut albums
Julian Cope albums
Mercury Records albums